Penthimiini is a tribe of leafhoppers in the subfamily Deltocephalinae. Penthimiini contains 46 genera and over 200 species.

Genera 
There are currently 46 described genera in Penthimiini:

References 

Deltocephalinae